The Voice of Holland (season 4) is the fourth season of the Dutch reality singing competition, created by media tycoon John de Mol and the first sophomore season ever of the show's format. It aired during 2013 on RTL4 and was announced during broadcasts of the third season of the show. Martijn Krabbé and Wendy van Dijk returned as co-hosts, while Winston Gerschtanowitz returned as host in the red room. Marco Borsato and Trijntje Oosterhuis were the only coaches from season 3 to return for season 4. Nick & Simon and Roel van Velzen were replaced by Ilse DeLange and Ali B after their departures. The winner was Julia van der Toorn, mentored by Borsato. This was the first season where a coach did not win in their first season and the first to have two members of the same team in the final.

One of the important premises of the show is the quality of the singing talent. Four coaches, themselves popular performing artists, train the talents in their group and occasionally perform with them. Talents are selected in blind auditions, where the coaches cannot see, but only hear the auditioner.

Coaches
Nick Schilder of Nick & Simon announced during season 3 in 2012 that he would not be coming back after three seasons of the show, citing burnout being tied almost throughout the year with the show and touring engagements. Roel van Velzen, another veteran of the show who stayed for the initial three seasons, announced he will not be sitting as a coach for a fourth time around. Ilse DeLange and Ali B then joined returning coaches Marco Borsato and Trijntje Oosterhuis for season 4.

Teams
Color key

External links
 The Voice of Holland Official website
 Mitchell Brunings Website

Season 04
2013 Dutch television seasons
2010 Dutch television series debuts